Thomas Bo Larsen (born 27 November 1963) is a Danish film actor, born in Gladsaxe, Denmark.

Career
He was nominated for a Bodil Award in 1995 for Best Supporting Actor in "Sidste time", and later won two Robert Awards, the first in 1996 for Best Actor in "De største helte", and a second one in 1998 for Best Supporting Actor for his role in "Festen" by Thomas Vinterberg.

He has appeared in 54 films since 1984, including four with Vinterberg.

Personal life
He's been married to Patricia Schumann since 2001, and lives in Copenhagen.

Selected filmography

 Pusher (1996), drug addict
 Festen (1998), Michael
 Ambulance (2005)
 The Hunt (2012), Theo
 A Second Chance (2014), Klaus
 Another Round (2020), Tommy

External links

Danish male actors
Living people
1963 births
People from Gladsaxe Municipality
Best Actor Robert Award winners